Václav Hošek (18 August 1909 – June 1943) was a Czech middle-distance runner. He competed in the men's 3000 metres steeplechase at the 1936 Summer Olympics. During World War II, he was captured by the Gestapo and was later shot when he attempted to escape from a prisoner-of-war camp.

References

External links
 

1909 births
1943 deaths
Athletes (track and field) at the 1936 Summer Olympics
Czech male middle-distance runners
Czech male steeplechase runners
Olympic athletes of Czechoslovakia
Czechoslovak prisoners of war
Czechoslovak military personnel killed in World War II
World War II prisoners of war held by Germany
Deaths by firearm in Germany